The 2017 Bhutan National League was the sixth season of national football competition in Bhutan, having replaced the A-Division (Bhutan) in 2013. Again, the Thimphu League provides the qualifiers from Thimphu, with the top three teams in that competition being awarded places in the National League alongside three regional teams.

Thimphu League

Format and rules
The Thimphu League is a regional competition for teams from Thimphu. the competition consists of nine teams, each plays the others twice – home and away – for a total of 16 games each, over 18 game weeks. 3 points are awarded for a win, 1 point for a draw and 0 points for a loss. The league table is decided firstly on points won, then on goal difference and finally on total goals scored if the previous two are equal. The first three teams automatically qualify for the National league, the bottom two teams compete in relegation playoffs with the top two teams from the B-Division for two places in the next seasons's competition.

Competing clubs

 Bhutan U-19s
 Druk Pol
 Druk Stars
 Druk United
 High Quality United
 Terton
 Thimphu
 Thimphu City
 Transport United

Season summary
The 2017 season of the Thimphu League, previously called the Bhutan A-Division, started on 4 February 2017 and is due to end on 8 July. Thimphu City are defending champions and the competition has been expanded to 9 teams in 2017 with the addition of High Quality United, Bhutan U19 and the return of Transport United following the relegation of Tensung and Bhutan U17. On July 1, 2017, Druk Pol F.C. was suspended for 2 years after some of its players mishandled and disobeyed the referee during a match on June 29.

League table

Results

National League

League table

References

Bhutan National League seasons
Bhutan
1